Chris Craft may refer to:
 Chris Craft (racing driver) (1939–2021), British motor racing driver
 Chris-Craft Boats, the original American boat manufacturer established in the 19th Century
 Chris-Craft Corporation, the current American boat manufacturer established in 2000
 Chris-Craft Industries, a former manufacturing and broadcasting company and co-owner of the defunct UPN television network
 Crisscraft, 1975 jazz album by saxophonist Sonny Criss

See also
 Christine Craft (born 1944), attorney, radio talk show host, television news anchor
 Christopher C. Kraft Jr. (1924–2019), former NASA engineer and manager